

Jakob Ludwig Salomon Bartholdy (13 May 1779 – 27 July 1825) was a Prussian diplomat and art patron.

Life

He was born Jakob Salomon in Berlin of Jewish parentage. His father was Levin Jakob Salomon and his mother was Bella Salomon, née Bella Itzig. Jakob was educated at the University of Halle.  He took the additional surname 'Bartholdy' from a property owned by his family on his conversion to Reformed Christianity.

Bartholdy fought in the Austrian army against Napoleon, afterward entered the diplomatic service of Prussia, and accompanied the Allied armies to Paris in 1814, whence he was dispatched to Rome in the following year as Prussian Consul-General.  He was a great patron of the arts. The revival of fresco painting amongst young German artists in Italy was due largely to his patronage. A group of artists composed of Johann Friedrich Overbeck, Peter von Cornelius, Philipp Veit, and Friedrich Wilhelm Schadow decorated a room of his palace with frescoes. His valuable collection of antiques was bought for the Berlin Museum of Art, while the frescos of his mansion at Rome, the so-called Casa Zuccari, were transferred by Stefano Bardini in 1886-87 to the Berlin National Gallery.

He is buried in the Protestant Cemetery, Rome.

Family

Bartholdy's sister Lea was married to Abraham Mendelssohn, and Bartholdy persuaded him to adopt his 'Christian' surname to differentiate the family from its connection with Abraham's father, the philosopher Moses Mendelssohn.

See also
Itzig family

Notes

External links

1779 births
1825 deaths
Converts to Protestantism from Judaism
German diplomats
German Ashkenazi Jews
German Calvinist and Reformed Christians
Mendelssohn family
19th-century philanthropists